Ronald Cedric "Ron" White, Jr. (born May 22, 1939) is an American historian, author, and lecturer. He has written bestselling and award-winning biographies and books on Abraham Lincoln and Ulysses S. Grant. He is a senior fellow at the Trinity Forum.

Education
Born on May 22, 1939, in Minneapolis, Minnesota, White is the son of Ronald C. and Evelyn Pearson White. He was educated at Lincoln Elementary School in Salinas, California; R. D. White Elementary School, and Woodrow Wilson Junior High School.  White graduated from Glendale High School in Glendale, California, in 1957.

With an interest in both speech and journalism, White enrolled in Northwestern University in 1957. He transferred to UCLA in 1958, where he majored in American history. He graduated with a BA with honors in 1961.

White entered Princeton Theological Seminary in 1961 and graduated with an MDiv degree in 1964, winning the Seminary Prize in History.

From 1964 through 1968, while serving as a minister of the First Presbyterian Church in Colorado Springs, Colorado, White taught in the history department at Colorado College. In 1966–67 he served as a World Council of Churches Scholar in England, studying English church history at Lincoln Theological College in Lincoln, England. Returning to Colorado Springs, he became the founding director of the Martin Luther King Jr. Education Fund, created in April 1968 in response to the assassination of King.

Accepted into the Ph.D. program at Princeton University in 1968, White studied both in the religion department with professors John F. Wilson and Horton Davies, and in the history department with James M. McPherson and Arthur S. Link.  Under their mentorship, he wrote a Ph.D. dissertation, "The Social Gospel and the Negro in the Progressive Era, 1890–1920."  He received a Ph.D. from Princeton in 1972.

White taught at Rider College from 1972 to 1974 and at Whitworth College from 1974 to 1981. In 1975 he co-authored with C. Howard Hopkins The Social Gospel: Religion and Reform in Changing America. This book, still in print, pushed the boundaries chronologically and topically of the traditional interpretation of the Social Gospel to include African-Americans, Jews, women, and the South.

White served as director of continuing education and taught church history at Princeton Theological Seminary from 1981 to 1988. In 1984 he offered the Walter Rauschenbusch Lectures at Colgate-Rochester Seminary.  An expanded version of the lectures was published in 1990 as Liberty and Justice for All: Racial Reform and the Social Gospel.

Books
White published two monographs: The Social Gospel: Religion and Reform in Changing America (Harpercollins, 1976); and Liberty and Justice for All: Racial Reform and the Social Gospel (Temple University Press, 1990).

Lincoln's Greatest Speech
In 2002 White authored Lincoln's Greatest Speech: The Second Inaugural. A Washington Post and San Francisco Chronicle bestseller, the New York Times selected it a Notable Book for 2002. James M. McPherson declared, "Lincoln thought the Second Inaugural to be his greatest speech—even more profound than the Gettysburg Address.  Ronald C. White's remarkable analysis of the Second Inaugural will convince readers that Lincoln was right." David Herbert Donald called the book "both learned and accessible."

The Eloquent President
In 2005 White authored The Eloquent President: A Portrait of Lincoln Through His Words. A Los Angeles Times bestseller and a selection of the History Book Club.  The Wall Street Journal observed, "Lincoln's eloquence was of …a rare kind.  Ronald C. White captures its qualities admirably . . . in this outstanding book." The Washington Post judged it "splendid…The Eloquent President is an insightful, highly readable exploration of genius."

A. Lincoln: A Biography
White authored A. Lincoln: A Biography in 2009 during the bicentennial of Lincoln's birth. It was a New York Times, Washington Post, and Los Angeles Times bestseller. USA Today stated, "If you read one book about Lincoln, make it A. Lincoln." The biography was named one of the best books of 2009 by the Washington Post, Philadelphia Inquirer, St. Louis Post-Dispatch, Christian Science Monitor, and Barnes & Noble. Harold Holzer wrote: "Each generation requires—and seems to inspire—its own masterly one-volume Lincoln biography, and scholar Ronald C. White has crowned the bicentennial year with an instant classic for the twenty-first century." In 2010 A. Lincoln won a Christopher Award which salutes books that "affirm the highest values of the human spirit."
Reviewer Phillip C. Stone says:

American Ulysses
In 2016, White published American Ulysses: A Life of Ulysses S. Grant in 2016, which became an instant New York Times bestseller. General (Ret.) David H. Petraeus declared, "Certain to be recognized as the classic work on Grant, American Ulysses is a monumental examination of one of the most compelling figures in American history." Jon Meacham wrote, "In this thorough and engaging new book, Ronald C. White restores U. S. Grant to the pantheon of great Americans." Presidential historian Richard Norton Smith stated, "Employing a perspective as fresh as his newly tapped sources, White at last solves the Grant Enigma—reconciling in character and ability the hero of Appomattox with the (allegedly) failed President.  It is the biography that Grant deserves, and that only a scholar of the first rank can deliver."

Reviewer Richard G. Mannion, states regarding American Ulysses:

Family
Ron White is married to Cynthia Conger White and lives in La Canada, California. He has two adult children by a previous marriage.

References

External links
 
 

Historians of the United States
1939 births
Living people
Historians of the American Civil War
20th-century American historians
American male non-fiction writers
20th-century American male writers
21st-century American historians
21st-century American biographers
21st-century American male writers
American male biographers
University of California, Los Angeles alumni
Princeton Theological Seminary alumni
Colorado College faculty
Rider University faculty
Whitworth University faculty
Princeton Theological Seminary faculty
Writers from Minneapolis